The burgstall of Alter Schlossberg is the site of an old castle located on a plateau-like hilltop, the so-called Schlossberg ("castle hill"), about 500 metres southeast of Burggaillenreuth, a village in the borough of Ebermannstadt in the county of Forchheim, in the south German state of Bavaria.

The medieval burgstall is the site of a spur castle, of which only a few rampart remains have survived. It appears to have been a circular rampart probably from the late Hallstatt period and early La Tène period.

Literature 
 Rainer Hofmann (rev.): Fränkische Schweiz. Führer zu archäologischen Denkmälern in Deutschland 20.  Stuttgart, 1990

External links 
 

Castles in Bavaria
Ebermannstadt